Metzneria aestivella is a moth of the family Gelechiidae. It is found in most of Europe, except Iceland, Norway, Lithuania, Slovakia and Ukraine. The habitat consists of dry, sunny areas with low-growing herbaceous plants.

The wingspan is 11–15 mm. The terminal joint of palpi slender, 2/3 of second. Forewings pale are ochreous, more or less wholly suffused with reddish-ochreous ; margins and veins partly marked with fuscous lines. Hindwings are grey. The larva is whitish ; head and plate of 2 blackish. Adults are similar to Metzneria lappella and Metzneria metzneriella but lack the black discal spot on the forewing. Adults are on wing from June to July.

Larvae can be found in winter and spring in old flowers of Carlina vulgaris, Pyrethrum corymbosum and Carlina acaulis. Full-grown larvae reach a length of 8–9 mm. They have a cream-coloured body. The colour of the head varies from dark-brown to red-brown. Pupation takes place in mid-May, usually outside of the flower seeds.

Subspecies
Metzneria aestivella aestivella
Metzneria aestivella dichroa Walsingham, 1908 (Canary Islands)

References

Moths described in 1839
Metzneria
Moths of Europe
Insects of Turkey